The Magdalena River Valley is a valley in Colombia located within the Colombian Andes. The valley is specifically situated between the Central and Eastern Ranges and crossed by the river of the same name, the Magdalena River.

Geology 
The Magdalena River Valley was formed after a series of tectonic formed depressions that filled up with continental sediment in the Tertiary period. These sediments came from the Central Ranges of the Colombian Andes. The Magdalena Valley, subdivided into the Upper (VSM), Middle (VMM) and Lower Magdalena Valleys (VIM), is an important area for oil exploration in Colombia.

Flora and fauna

Flora 
The first recorded European contact with the potato was in 1537 in the Magdalena Valley. The Spanish invaders became familiar with the crop and it was probably around 1570 when a Spanish ship first introduced potatoes to Europe.

Fauna 

The Magdalena River Valley is home to a species of butterfly, Magdalena Valley ringlet or Splendeuptychia ackeryi, first identified in 2009. There are many endangered mammals and birds found in the region, including the brown spider monkey and the endemic blue-billed curassow and white-mantled barbet. These species are threatened by habitat loss, among other factors.

References 

Valleys of Colombia
River valleys of Colombia
Valley